G-sharp, G or G# may refer to:

 G-sharp minor, a musical key
 G-sharp major, a musical key
 G♯ (musical note)
 Granville Sharp, an eighteenth-century abolitionist 
 G-sharp guitar, designed by Øivin Fjeld